Bozyamaç is a village in the Şemdinli District in Hakkâri Province in Turkey. The village is populated by Kurds of the Humaru and Xanî tribes and had a population of 292 in 2022.

Bozyamaç has three hamlets attached to it: Meydan, Deravi and Öncü. Only Deravi is populated.

Population 
Population history of the village from 2007 to 2022:

References 

Villages in Şemdinli District
Kurdish settlements in Hakkâri Province